Ullathil Kuzhanthaiyadi is a 1978 Indian Tamil-language film directed by K. S. Gopalakrishnan, starring Jaishankar and Sripriya. It was released on 25 February 1978.

Plot

Cast 
Jaishankar
Sripriya
Thengai Srinivasan

Soundtrack 
The music was composed by Shankar–Ganesh.

References

External links 
 

1970 films
1970s Tamil-language films
1978 films
Films directed by K. S. Gopalakrishnan
Films scored by Shankar–Ganesh
Films with screenplays by K. S. Gopalakrishnan